Thailand is a nation that has competed at the Hopman Cup tournament on two occasions. The nation's first appearance came in 2000, when they won the qualification play-off and went on to reach the final, eventually finishing as the runners-up. This remains their best performance to date.

Thailand also participated a number of times in the now defunct Asian Hopman Cup, a qualifying tournament which ran from 2006 until 2009 and granted the winners entry into the Hopman Cup the following year. In 2006, 2008 and 2009 Thailand failed to progress past the round robin stage of the event but in 2007 they hosted the event and finished as the runners-up to Chinese Taipei.

Players
This is a list of players who have played for Thailand in the Hopman Cup.

Results

1 In the 2000 tie against Slovakia, the female Slovakian competitor, Henrieta Nagyová, was forced to retire during the singles match and was also unable to play the mixed doubles match. This conceded two points to Thailand and helped towards their eventual 3–0 victory over Slovakia.

References

Hopman Cup teams
Hopman Cup
t